Twentieth Century is the eighteenth studio album by American country music band Alabama, released in 1999 by RCA Records. It produced the singles "(God Must Have Spent) A Little More Time on You", a collaboration with 'N Sync, "Small Stuff", "We Made Love" and "Twentieth Century", which respectively reached numbers 3, 24, 63, and 51 on the Hot Country Songs charts. In addition, "(God Must Have Spent) A Little More Time on You" was the band's last top ten hit on the country charts.

"(God Must Have Spent) A Little More Time On You" was originally recorded by 'N Sync in 1998 on their first album *NSYNC.

The album peaked at No. 5 on Billboard Country Albums chart and No. 51 on the Billboard 200.

Critical reception

Stephen Thomas Erlewine of Allmusic rated the album 2 out of 5 stars, saying that "There's not a note out of place or a missed harmony. It's easy to marvel at the sheer technical achievement of the record, since not only is it so well made, but the songs rarely make an impression…That's the problem with Twentieth Century: although it's pleasant, it never creates its own identity, even compared to latter-day Alabama records." He praised "Twentieth Century", "Mist of Desire", "Life's Too Short to Love This Fast", and "God Must Have Spent a Little More Time on You" as the best tracks, but said that "taken in the context of the record, they're nearly indistinguishable from the rest".

Track listing

Personnel 
Compiled from liner notes.
Alabama
 Randy Owen – vocals, acoustic guitars
 Jeff Cook – vocals, electric guitars, lead vocals (8)
 Teddy Gentry – vocals, bass guitar, lead vocals (6)

Mark Herndon is not credited on the album.

Additional musicians
 John Barlow Jarvis – acoustic  piano, keyboards, Hammond B3 organ
 Brian D. Siewert – synth strings
 Mark Casstevens – acoustic guitars
 Brent Rowan – electric guitars, 12-string electric guitar, gut-string guitar, electric sitar
 Michael Rhodes – bass guitar
 Glenn Worf – bass guitar
 Lonnie Wilson – drums, percussion
 Jim Nelson – saxophones
 Dean C. Pastin – saxophones
 Larry Hanson – trumpet
 Don Cook – backing vocals
 Liana Manis – backing vocals
 NSYNC – vocals (2)

Production
 Alabama – producers
 Don Cook – producer 
 Mike Bradley – recording, mixing 
 Mark Capps – recording, editing 
 Dave Boyer – editing 
 John Kunz – editing 
 Hank Williams – mastering at MasterMix (Nashville, Tennessee)
 Bill Brunt – art direction, design 
 Susan Eaddy – art direction 
 Blake Morgan – design 
 Peter Nash – photography

Chart performance

Weekly charts

Year-end charts

Certifications

References

1999 albums
RCA Records albums
Alabama (American band) albums
Albums produced by Don Cook